Two ships of the French Navy have borne the name Montebello

, an Océan-class ship of the line
, a Téméraire-class ship of the line

French Navy ship names